Marcial Solis was the Honduras Minister of Education. He was formerly the head of Honduras' National Council of Education and Auditor of the National University of Agriculture (UNA). He replaced Rutilia Calderon. He was succeeded by Arnaldo Bueso.

External links 

 National University of Agriculture 
 National Council of Education

References

Living people
Government ministers of Honduras
Year of birth missing (living people)